The Watch Tower Bible and Tract Society produces religious literature primarily for use by Jehovah's Witnesses. The organization's international writing, artwork, translation, and printery workforce are all baptized Jehovah's Witnesses. Since 2001, the literature produced by the Watch Tower Society is said to have been "published by Jehovah's Witnesses". Prior to 1931, the Watch Tower Society produced literature for the Bible Student movement.

Unbulleted publications are generally out of print and considered obsolete. Indented publications are superseded by more recent publications. Some publications are out of print but are still officially available in PDF format, as indicated.

Bible translations 
Wisdom From the Gospels (chapters 5 to 7 of Matthew containing the Sermon on the Mount) (2022)
New World Translation of the Holy Scriptures (Study Edition) (2015, updated annually; online only)
New World Translation of the Holy Scriptures—With References (1984)
New World Translation of the Holy Scriptures (students' edition) (1963)

 New World Translation of the Holy Scriptures (1961, revised 1970, 1971, 1981, 1984, 2006, 2013)
New World Translation of the Hebrew Scriptures, Volume I (Genesis to Ruth) (1953)
New World Translation of the Hebrew Scriptures, Volume II (1 Samuel to Esther) (1955)
New World Translation of the Hebrew Scriptures, Volume III (Job to Song of Solomon) (1957)
New World Translation of the Hebrew Scriptures, Volume IV (Isaiah to Lamentations) (1958)
New World Translation of the Hebrew Scriptures, Volume V (Ezekiel to Malachi) (1960)
New World Translation of the Christian Greek Scriptures (1950, revised 1951)

The Kingdom Interlinear Translation of the Greek Scriptures (1969, revised 1985; out of print, available online)

The Watch Tower Society also acquired publishing rights for the following Bible translations:
The Bible in Living English (1972, revised 1989; out of print, available online)—by Steven T. Byington
American Standard Version (1944)
King James Version (1907 with Watch Tower Society appendices entitled Berean Bible Teachers' Manual, revised 1908; 1942)
The Emphatic Diaglott (1902, 1926)
Holman Linear Parallel Edition (1902, parallel King James Version and Revised Version, with Watch Tower Society appendices)
Joseph B. Rotherham's New Testament Critically Emphasised, Second Edition (1890)

Books

Reference works 

 Research Guide for Jehovah's Witnesses (annually since 2012), a simplified index referencing publications primarily from 2000 onward
 Watch Tower Publications Index (annually since 1961, periodically combined into various volumes), subject index for Watch Tower Society publications since 1930
 Index to Watch Tower reprints 1879-1919 (1922)
 Watch Tower Index 1895-1899 (1900)

 Insight on the Scriptures, 2 volumes (1988, revised 2015, 2018; out of print, available online)
 Aid to Bible Understanding (1971)
 Aid to Bible Understanding (A–Exodus) (1969)

 Reasoning from the Scriptures (1985, revised 1989)
 "Make Sure of All Things; Hold Fast to What is Fine" (1965)
 "Make Sure of All Things" (1953, revised 1957)

Comprehensive Concordance of the New World Translation of the Holy Scriptures (1973)

 "All Scripture Is Inspired of God and Beneficial" (1963, revised 1983, 1990)
 "Equipped for Every Good Work" (1946)

For daily use 
 Examining the Scriptures Daily, annually since 1986
 Daily Heavenly Manna for the Household of Faith (1905, revised 1907 as Daily Heavenly Manna and Birthday Record)
 Calendar of Jehovah's Witnesses, annually 1983 to 2016

Yearbook 
 Service Year Report (preaching statistics), annually since 2017
 Yearbook of Jehovah's Witnesses, annually from 1940 to 2017
 Year Book of Jehovah's Witnesses, annually from 1934 to 1939
 Year Book of the International Bible Students Association, 1922, 1925, annually from 1927 to 1933

For use in formal Bible studies

Primary study aids 
These publications are intended to convert interested individuals.
 Enjoy Life Forever!—An Interactive Bible Course (2021)
 What Can the Bible Teach Us? (2015) (simplified version of What Does the Bible Really Teach?)   
 What Does the Bible Really Teach? (2005, revised 2014; out of print, available online)
Knowledge That Leads to Everlasting Life (1995, 1997, 2000)
You Can Live Forever in Paradise on Earth (1982, revised 1989)
The Truth That Leads to Eternal Life (1968, revised 1981)
"Things in Which It Is Impossible for God to Lie" (1965)
You May Survive Armageddon into God's New World (1955)
"Let God Be True" (1946, revised 1952)
"The Truth Shall Make You Free" (1943)
The Harp of God (1921)
Millions Now Living Will Never Die! (1920)
Studies in the Scriptures (1904, also issued as Millennial Dawn; revised 1909, 1915; 1917 addition of The Finished Mystery, revised 1923), 6 volumes by Charles Taze Russell:
The Divine Plan of the Ages (1886 as The Plan of the Ages, revised 1887, 1903, 1907, 1908, 1911, 1913)
The Time is at Hand (1888, revised 1889)
Thy Kingdom Come (1891)
The Battle of Armageddon (1897 as The Day of Vengeance, revised 1912)
The At-one-ment Between God and Man (1899, revised 1915)
The New Creation (1904)

Secondary study aids 
Secondary aids are considered just before or shortly after baptism.
How to Remain in God's Love (2018, simplified version of "Keep Yourselves in God's Love")
"Keep Yourselves in God's Love" (2008, revised 2014)
Worship the Only True God (2002)
United in Worship of the Only True God (1983)
"Let Your Kingdom Come" (1981)
Life Everlasting—in Freedom of the Sons of God (1966)
"This Means Everlasting Life" (1950)

Supplementary study aids 
"Come Be My Follower" (2007; out of print, available online)
Draw Close to Jehovah (2002, revised 2014, 2022; out of print, available online)
The Bible—God's Word or Man's? (1989), intended to convince that the Bible is reliable
Is the Bible Really the Word of God? (1969)
True Peace and Security—How Can You Find It? (1986)
True Peace and Security—From What Source? (1973)

About other religions 
Mankind's Search for God (1990), a review of major religions
What Has Religion Done for Mankind? (1951)

Bible commentaries 
 Imitate their Faith (2013), commentaries on various biblical characters

Old Testament 
 Pure Worship of Jehovah—Restored At Last! (2018, revised 2019), commentary on Ezekiel
 "The Nations Shall Know That I Am Jehovah"—How? (1971)
 Vindication, 3 volumes (1931–1933)
 God's Word for Us Through Jeremiah (2010; out of print, available online), commentary on Jeremiah
 Live With Jehovah's Day in Mind (2006; out of print, available online), commentary on the twelve minor prophets (Hosea through Malachi)
 Paradise Restored To Mankind—By Theocracy! (1972), commentary on Haggai and Zechariah
 Religion (1940), commentary on Joel
 Preparation (1933), commentary on Zechariah

 Isaiah's Prophecy—Light for All Mankind, 2 volumes (vol. 1: 2000; vol. 2: 2001), verse-by-verse commentary on Isaiah
 Worldwide Security Under the "Prince of Peace" (1986)
 Man's Salvation Out of World Distress at Hand! (1975)
 "New Heavens and a New Earth" (1953)

 Pay Attention to Daniel's Prophecy! (1999, revised 2006), verse-by-verse commentary on Daniel
 Our Incoming World Government—God's Kingdom (1977)
 "Your Will Be Done on Earth" (1958)

 The New World (1942), commentary on Job
 Life (1929)

 Preservation (1932), commentary on Ruth and Esther

New Testament 
 Jesus—The Way, the Truth, the Life (2015), narrative of the Gospels (Matthew, Mark, Luke, John)
 The Greatest Man Who Ever Lived (1991; out of print, available online)

 "Bearing Thorough Witness" About God's Kingdom (2009, revised 2022; out of print, available online), commentary on Acts of the Apostles

 Revelation—Its Grand Climax at Hand! (1988, revised 2006), verse-by-verse commentary on Revelation
 "Then Is Finished the Mystery of God" (1969) (Revelation chapters 1–13)
 "Babylon the Great Has Fallen!" God's Kingdom Rules! (1963) (Revelation chapters 14–22)
 Light (two volumes) (1930)
 The Finished Mystery (1917)

 Choosing the Best Way of Life (1979), commentary on First and Second Peter

 Commentary on the Letter of James (1979), verse-by-verse commentary on James

History of Jehovah's Witnesses 
 God's Kingdom Rules! (2014)
 Jehovah's Witnesses—Proclaimers of God's Kingdom (1993)
 Jehovah's Witnesses in the Divine Purpose (1959)

For evangelism training
 Apply Yourself to Reading and Teaching (2018)
 Benefit from Theocratic Ministry School Education (2002; out of print, available online)
 Theocratic Ministry School Guidebook (1971, revised 1992)

 Kingdom Ministry School Course (1960, revised 1972)
 Qualified to Be Ministers (1955, revised 1967)
 Theocratic Aid to Kingdom Publishers (1945)
 Course in Theocratic Ministry (1943)

For children and young people
 Questions Young People Ask—Answers That Work, 2 volumes (vol. 1: 1989, revised 2011; vol. 2: 2008)
 Your Youth—Getting the Best Out of It (1976)

 Learn From the Great Teacher (2003)
 Listening to the Great Teacher (1971)

 Lessons You Can Learn From the Bible (2017)
 My Book of Bible Stories (1978, revised 2004; out of print, available online)
 From Paradise Lost to Paradise Regained (1958)
 Children (1941)
 The Way to Paradise (1924)

For families
 The Secret of Family Happiness (1996)
 Making Your Family Life Happy (1978)

Evolution vs creation
 Is There a Creator Who Cares About You? (1998)
 Life—How Did It Get Here? By Evolution or by Creation? (1985, revised 2006)
 Did Man Get Here by Evolution or by Creation? (1967)

 Creation (1927)

 Scenario of the Photo-Drama of Creation (1914), accompanying The Photo-Drama of Creation
 Scenario of the Photo-Drama of Creation (1914), 3 volumes accompanying the Eureka Drama

For specific roles

Baptismal candidates
 Organized to Do Jehovah's Will (2005, revised 2015, 2019)
 Organized to Accomplish Our Ministry (1983, revised 1989)
 Organization for Kingdom-Preaching and Disciple-Making (1972)
 "Your Word Is a Lamp to My Foot" (1967)

Elders
 "Shepherd the Flock of God"—1 Peter 5:2 (2010, revised 2012, 2019, 2020)
 "Pay Attention to Yourselves and to All the Flock" (1991)
 Index to Letters

Branch office staff
 Branch Organization (revised 2003), for branch overseers
 "Dwelling Together in Unity" (1952, revised 1974, 1982, 1989, 1996, 2004)
 Standards Manual (2005), for proofreaders
 Writing for Our Journals, for writers

Other
 Memorandum for Regional Building Committees, for Regional Building Committee members
 Working Together Safely—Safety Rules and Standards for Volunteer Projects, for Regional Building Committee volunteers
 District Convention Operations (1997), for Convention Committee members
 "Fully Accomplish Your Ministry"—2 Timothy 4:5 (2014), for attendees of the pioneer service school
Shining as Illuminators in the World (1977, revised 1989, 2004)
 Missionary Counsel Booklet (1985), for missionaries

Legal guidance for members
 Preparing for a Child Custody Case Involving Religious Issues (1997)
 Direct and Cross Examination Questions in Child Custody Cases (1987)
 "Defending and Legally Establishing the Good News" (1950)

For medical practitioners
Family Care and Medical Management for Jehovah's Witnesses (1992, revised 1995)

Other out-of-print books
 Survival Into a New Earth (1984)
 Happiness—How to Find It (1980)
 Life Does Have a Purpose (1977)
 Good News—To Make You Happy (1976)
 Holy Spirit—The Force Behind the Coming New Order! (1976)
 God's "Eternal Purpose" Now Triumphing For Man's Good (1974)
 Is This Life All There Is? (1974)
 God's Kingdom of a Thousand Years Has Approached (1973)
 "Let Your Name be Sanctified" (1961)
 "The Kingdom Is at Hand" (1944)
 Salvation (1939)
 Enemies (1937)
 Riches (1936)
 Jehovah (1934)
 Prophecy (1929)
 Government (1928)
 Reconciliation (1928)
 Deliverance (1926)
 Comfort for the Jews (1925)
 The Revelation of Jesus Christ—According to the Sinaitic Text (1918)
 Pastor Russell's Sermons (1917)
 Berean Bible Teachers' Manual (1909)

Magazines 
 The Watchtower Announcing Jehovah's Kingdom (public edition) (annually as of 2022)
 The Watchtower Announcing Jehovah's Kingdom (public edition) (four-monthly as of 2018)
 The Watchtower Announcing Jehovah's Kingdom (public edition) (every two months as of 2016)
 The Watchtower Announcing Jehovah's Kingdom (public edition) (reduced from 32 pages to 16 pages as of 2013)
 The Watchtower Announcing Jehovah's Kingdom (public edition) (monthly as of 2008)
 The Watchtower Announcing Jehovah's Kingdom (four-color edition as of 1986)
 The Watchtower Announcing Jehovah's Kingdom (title change, March 1, 1939)
 The Watchtower and Herald of Christ's Kingdom (title change, 1939)
 The Watchtower and Herald of Christ's Presence (title change, October 15, 1931)
 The Watch Tower and Herald of Christ's Presence (title and cover change, 1909)
 Zion's Watch Tower and Herald of Christ's Presence (semi-monthly as of 1892)
 Zion's Watch Tower and Herald of Christ's Presence (monthly, July 1879)

 The Watchtower Announcing Jehovah's Kingdom (study edition) (monthly, 2008)
 The Watchtower Announcing Jehovah's Kingdom (simplified study edition) (July 15, 2011 – December 15, 2018)

 Awake! (annually as of 2022)
 Awake! (four-monthly as of 2018)
 Awake! (every two months as of 2016)
 Awake! (reduced from 32 pages to 16 pages as of 2013)
 Awake! (monthly as of 2006)
 Awake! (four-color edition as of 1987)
 Awake! (title change, semi-monthly, August 22, 1946)
 Consolation (title change, October 6, 1937 to July 31, 1946)
 The Golden Age ("every other Wednesday", October 1, 1919 to September 22, 1937)

Other magazines 
Jehovas Jugend (Jehovah's Youth, 1933 – 1936, Switzerland)
"Thy Word Is Truth" (1943 – ?, Canada)

Newsletter 
 Our Christian Life and Ministry—Meeting Workbook (title change, January 2016), a periodical intended to improve members' preaching skills
 Our Kingdom Ministry (title change, 1982)
 Our Kingdom Service (title change, 1976)
 Kingdom Ministry (title change, September 1956)
 Informant (title change, July 1936)
 Director for Field Publishers (title change, October 1935)
 Bulletin for Jehovah's Witnesses (title change, 1931)
 Watch Tower Bulletin (title change, 1930)
 Bulletin (title change, 1919)
 Suggestions from Colporteurs (title change, 1918)
 Suggestive Hints to New Colporteurs (title change, 1914)
 Suggestive Hints to Colporteurs (1896 to 1913)

 Public Meeting Campaign (1945 to 1946)
 Instructions for Car Drivers (1933)
 Outline for Transcription Meetings (1933)
 Your Work With Transcription Machines  (1933)
 Bearing Testimony (1932)
 To Whom the Work Is Entrusted (1919)

Music

Songbooks 
 "Sing Out Joyfully" to Jehovah (2016; 151 Kingdom songs)
 Sing to Jehovah—New Songs (2014–2016; 19 songs added)
 Sing to Jehovah (2009; 135 Kingdom songs)
 Sing Praises to Jehovah (1984; 225 Kingdom songs)
 "Singing and Accompanying Yourselves With Music in Your Hearts" (1966; 119 songs)
 Songs to Jehovah's Praise (1950; 91 songs)
 Kingdom Service Song Book (1944; 62 songs)
 Songs of Praise to Jehovah (1928; 337 songs; a mixture of Bible Students' compositions and older hymns)
 Kingdom Hymns (1926; 80 songs, with music, especially for children)
 Hymns of the Millennial Dawn (1906; 333 songs published in 1890, with music added)
 Zion's Glad Songs (1900; 82 songs, many written by one Bible Student, to supplement the earlier collection)
 Zion's Glad Songs of the Morning (1896; published as the "Watch Tower" of February 1, lyrics for 11 songs, with music)
 Poems and Hymns of Millennial Dawn (1890, revised and reissued as Poems of Dawn 1912, revised 1915; 151 poems and 333 hymns, published without music; most were the works of well-known writers)
 Songs of the Bride (1879; 144 hymns)

Recordings 
 "Sing Out Joyfully" to Jehovah—Meetings (MP3 and MP4)
 Sing to Jehovah—Orchestral Accompaniment (MP3)
 Sing to Jehovah—New Songs—Orchestral Accompaniment (MP3)
 Sing to Jehovah—Piano Accompaniment (CD, MP3 and AAC)
 Sing Praises to Jehovah (piano accompaniment, CD in MP3 format)
 Sing Praises to Jehovah (piano accompaniment, CD in digital audio format)
 Sing Praises to Jehovah (piano accompaniment, audiocassette)
 Sing Praises to Jehovah (piano accompaniment, phonograph)
 "Singing and Accompanying Yourselves With Music in Your Hearts" (orchestral accompaniment, audiocassette)
 "Singing and Accompanying Yourselves With Music in Your Hearts" (orchestral accompaniment, phonograph)

 "Sing Out Joyfully" to Jehovah—Vocals (MP3)
 Sing to Jehovah—Chorus (MP3)
 Sing to Jehovah—Vocal Renditions, Discs 1–6 (CD, MP3 and AAC)
 Singing Kingdom Songs (audiocassette and CD)

 "Sing Out Joyfully" to Jehovah—Instrumental (MP3)
 Kingdom Melodies, Volumes 1–6, 9 (MP3 and AAC)
 Kingdom Melodies, Volumes 1–9 (CD in MP3 format)
 Kingdom Melodies, Volumes 1–9 (CD in digital audio format)
 Kingdom Melodies, Volumes 1–9 (audiocassette)

Brochures 

The brochures of Jehovah's Witnesses are used for both preaching and study. Some titles are intended specifically for Bible study courses, for study of a specific subject, or for reference.

Evolution vs creation
 The Origin of Life—Five Questions Worth Asking (2010)
 Was Life Created? (2010)

Evolution Versus the New World (1950)
The Photo-Drama of Creation (1914, four parts)

For study and preaching
 Enjoy Life Forever!—Introductory Bible Lessons (2020)
 Answers to 10 Questions Young People Ask (2016)
 Return to Jehovah (2015), designed for inactive Jehovah's Witnesses
 Teach Your Children (2014)
 Your Family Can Be Happy (2014)
 My Bible Lessons (2013), for infants
 How Can You Have a Happy Life? (2013), designed for Jews
 Will There Ever Be a World Without War? (1992; out of print, available online), designed for Jews
 Good News From God (2012, revised 2013)
 What Does God Require of Us? (1996)
 Who Are Doing Jehovah's Will Today? (2012, revised 2014)
 Jehovah's Witnesses—Who Are They? What Do They Believe? (2000)
 Jehovah's Witnesses—Unitedly Doing God's Will Worldwide (1986)
 Jehovah's Witnesses in the Twentieth Century (1978, revised 1979, 1989)
 Listen to God and Live Forever (2011)
 Enjoy Life on Earth Forever! (1982)
 Listen to God (simplified version of Listen to God and Live Forever) (2011)
 "Look! I Am Making All Things New!" (1959, revised 1970, 1986)
 The Pathway to Peace and Happiness (2010), designed for Buddhists
 Real Faith—Your Key to a Happy Life (2010), designed for Muslims
 The Guidance of God—Our Way to Paradise (1999), designed for Muslims
 The Bible—What Is Its Message? (2009)
 A Book for All People (1997; out of print, available online)

Keep on the Watch! (2004)

 The Road to Everlasting Life—Have You Found It? (2002), designed for the African population
 A Satisfying Life—How to Attain It (2001)
 You Can Be God's Friend! (2000)

 What Happens to Us When We Die? (1998)

 When Someone You Love Dies (1994, revised 2000, 2005)
 Why Should We Worship God in Love and Truth? (1993), designed for Hindus
 What Is the Purpose of Life? How You Can Find It? (1993)

 Does God Really Care About Us? (1992, revised 2001)

 Spirits of the Dead—Can They Help You or Harm You? Do They Really Exist? (1991, revised 2005)
 Unseen Spirits—Do They Help Us? Or Do They Harm Us? (1978), intended for followers of spiritism or tribal religion

 How Can Blood Save Your Life? (1990)

 Should You Believe in the Trinity (1989)
 The Government That Will Bring Paradise (1985, revised 1993)

 The Divine Name That Will Endure Forever (1984)

For members 
 Jehovah's Witnesses and Disaster Relief (2013)
 Dress & Grooming for Visitors Touring Bethel (2008, revised 2016)
 Charitable Planning to Benefit Kingdom Service Worldwide (2000, revised 2004, 2010)
 Planned Giving to Benefit Kingdom Service Worldwide (1994)
 Jehovah's Witnesses and Education (1995, revised 2002, 2015, 2019; out of print, available online), intended for educators

 "See the Good Land" (2003), maps and photos of the "Promised Land"

 School and Jehovah's Witnesses (1983)

Booklets 
 An Introduction to God's Word (2014), various non-English languages
Elementary Bible Teachings (1995)
 A Study Guide for God's Word (2014), various non-English languages
How to Improve Your Speaking and Teaching Ability (1995)
 Go, Make Disciples, Baptizing Them (2014), various non-English languages
How to Start and Continue Bible Discussions (1991)

Good News for People of All Nations (2004), a basic Bible message in many languages.
 Good News For All Nations (1983)
Victory Over Death (1986), intended for Hindus 
From Kurukshetra to Armageddon—and Your Survival (1983), intended for Hindus 
In Search of a Father (1983), intended for Buddhists 
The Time for True Submission to God (1983), intended for Muslims 
The Path of Divine Truth Leading to Liberation (1980), intended for Hindus 
Bible Topics for Discussion (1977), included in reduced format as a NWT appendix from 1981 
Jehovah's Witnesses and the Question of Blood (1977) 
Questions People Are Asking About Jehovah's Witnesses (1976), French 
A Secure Future—How You Can Find It (1975) 
Is There a God Who Cares? (1975) 
One World, One Government, Under God's Sovereignty (1975) 
There Is Much More to Life! (1975) 
Human Plans Failing as God's Purpose Succeeds (1974) 
Divine Victory—Its Meaning for Distressed Humanity (1973) 
Divine Rulership—The Only Hope of All Mankind (1972) 
When All Nations Collide, Head On, With God (1971) 
Saving the Human Race—In the Kingdom Way (1970) 
The Approaching Peace of a Thousand Years (1969) 
Man's Rule About to Give Way to God's Rule (1968) 
Learn to Read and Write (English) (1967) 
Rescuing a Great Crowd of Mankind out of Armageddon (1967) 
Why Does God Permit Wickedness? (1967), Hebrew 
What Has God's Kingdom Been Doing Since 1914? (1966) 
World Government on the Shoulder of the Prince of Peace (1965) 
Finding the Truth That Makes Men Free (1964), Vietnamese 
"Peace Among Men of Good Will" or Armageddon—Which? (1964) 
Living in Hope of a Righteous New World (1963) 
When God Is King Over All the Earth (1963) 
Take Courage—God's Kingdom Is at Hand! (1962) 
"The Word"—Who Is He? According to John (1962) 
Blood, Medicine and the Law of God (1961) 
Sermon Outlines (1961) 
When All Nations Unite Under God's Kingdom (1961) 
Security During "War of the Great Day of God the Almighty" (1960) 
When God Speaks Peace to All Nations (1959) 
God's Kingdom Rules—Is the World's End Near? (1958) 
Learn to Read and Write (Spanish) (1958) 
Healing of the Nations Has Drawn Near (1957) 
Christendom or Christianity—Which One Is "the Light of the World"? (1955) 
What Do the Scriptures Say About "Survival After Death"? (1955) 
World Conquest Soon—By God's Kingdom (1955) 
Theocratic Reading Aid for Jehovah's Witnesses (1954), Cinyanja 
"This Good News of the Kingdom" (1954, revised 1965) 
After Armageddon—God's New World (1953) 
Basis for Belief in a New World (1953) 
"Preach the Word" (1953) 
God's Way Is Love (1952) 
Will Religion Meet the World Crisis? (1951) 
Can You Live Forever in Happiness on Earth? (1950) 
The Kingdom Hope of All Mankind (1949) 
Permanent Governor of All Nations (1948) 
The Watchtower Story (1948) 
The Joy of All the People (1947) 
"Be Glad, Ye Nations" (1946) 
"The Prince of Peace" (1946) 
The "Commander to the Peoples" (1945) 
The Meek Inherit the Earth (1945) 
One World, One Government (1944) 
Religion Reaps the Whirlwind (1944) 
The Coming World Regeneration (1944) 
"The Kingdom of God Is Nigh" (1944) 
Fighting for Liberty on the Home Front (1943) 
Freedom in the New World (1943) 
Freedom of Worship (1943) 
Presenting "This Gospel of the Kingdom" (1943) 
Will You Judge Between Us? (1943), Denmark 
Hope—For the Dead—For the Survivors—In a Righteous World (1942) 
Jehovah's Witnesses: Who Are They? What Is Their Work? (1942), Zimbabwe 
Peace—Can It Last? (1942) 
Comfort All That Mourn (1941) 
God and the State (1941) 
Jehovah's Servants Defended (1941) 
Jehovah's Witnesses: Who Are They? What Is Their Work? (1941), South Africa 
Model Study No. 3 (1941) 
Theocracy (1941) 
Why Suppress the Kingdom Message? (1941), South Africa 
Conspiracy Against Democracy (1940) 
End of Nazism (1940) 
Judge Rutherford Uncovers Fifth Column (1940) 
Refugees (1940) 
Satisfied (1940) 
Advice for Kingdom Publishers (1939) 
Fascism or Freedom (1939) 
Government and Peace (1939) 
Liberty to Preach (Moyle) (1939) 
Model Study No. 2 (1939) 
Neutrality (1939) 
Cure (1938) 
Face the Facts (1938) 
Freedom or Romanism? (1938) 
Warning (1938) 
Armageddon (1937) 
Introducing the Kingdom Message in Your Language (1937) 
Model Study No. 1 (1937) 
Protection (1937) 
Safety (1937) 
Uncovered (1937) 
Choosing, Riches or Ruin—Which Is Your Choice? (1936) 
Favored People (1935) 
Government—Hiding the Truth, Why? (1935) 
His Vengeance (1935) 
Loyalty (1935) 
Supremacy (1935) 
Universal War Near (1935) 
Who Shall Rule the World? (1935) 
Angels (1934) 
Beyond the Grave (1934) 
Dividing the People (1934) 
His Works (1934) 
Intolerance (1934) 
Righteous Ruler (1934) 
Truth—Shall It Be Suppressed or Will Congress Protect the People's Rights? (1934) 
Why Pray for Prosperity? (1934) 
World Recovery? (1934) 
Escape to the Kingdom (1933) 
The Crisis (1933) 
Cause of Death (1932) 
Good News (1932) 
Health and Life (1932) 
Hereafter (1932) 
Home and Happiness (1932) 
Keys of Heaven (1932) 
Liberty (1932) 
The Final War (1932) 
What Is Truth? (1932) 
What You Need (1932) 
Who Is God? (1932) 
A Testimony (1931, revised 1934) 
Heaven and Purgatory (1931) 
The Kingdom, the Hope of the World (1931, revised 1932) 
Crimes and Calamities. The Cause. The Remedy (1930) 
Prohibition (and the) League of Nations—Born of God or the Devil, Which? The Bible Proof (1930) 
War or Peace, Which? (1930) 
Judgment (1929) 
Liberty to Preach (Rutherford) (1929) 
Oppression, When Will It End? (1929) 
Prosperity Sure (1928) 
The Last Days (1928) 
The Peoples Friend (1928) 
Freedom for the Peoples (1927) 
Questions on Deliverance (1927) 
Restoration (1927) 
Where Are the Dead? (1927, revised 1932) 
The Standard for the People (1926) 
Comfort for the People (1925) 
Our Lord's Return (1925) 
A Desirable Government (1924) 
Hell—What Is It? Who Are There? Can They Get Out? (1924) 
World Distress—Why? The Remedy (1923) 
The Bible on Hell (1921) 
The Bible on Our Lord's Return (1921) 
Can the Living Talk With the Dead? (1920) 
Talking With the Dead? (1920) 
Berean Studies on the New Creation (1914) 
In the Garden of the Lord (1913)

Jewish Hopes (1910) Sweet Brier Rose (1909) 
Berean Questions on Tabernacle Shadows of the Better Sacrifices (1909)

Sweet Brier Rose (1909)

The Wonderful Story of God's Love (1908)

Instructor's Guide and Berean Index (1907) 
Outlines of the Divine Plan of the Ages—Three Discourses on the Chart of the Ages (1896) 
A Conspiracy Exposed and Harvest Siftings (1894) 
Outlines of Sermons (1882) 
The Tabernacle and Its Teachings (1882) 
Food for Thinking Christians (1881)

Other brochures 
 Apply Yourself to Reading and Writing (1998)
Mission to Africa (1997), French & English
 Lasting Peace and Happiness—How to Find Them (1995, Chinese; 1996, revised 2009), for Buddhists
"All Scripture"—Authentic and Beneficial (1995), Polish
How to Read and Write (1995), Nigeria
Jehovah's Witnesses in Austria (1995), German
Jehovah's Witnesses in Bulgaria (1995), Bulgarian
Jehovah's Witnesses in Russia (2005 in Russian, revised 2008 also in English)
Your Neighbors, Jehovah's Witnesses—Who Are They? (1995, revised 1996), German
Apply Yourself to Reading and Writing (1994), Arabic
Jehovah's Witnesses in Greece (1993), English and Greek
Jehovah's Witnesses in Hungary (1993, revised 1996), Hungarian
Jehovah's Witnesses in the Czech Republic (1993), Czech
Our Problems—Who Will Help Us Solve Them? (1990), for Hindus
Centennial of the Watch Tower Bible and Tract Society of Pennsylvania (1984)
Apply Yourself to Reading and Writing (1983, revised 1988), French
Blood Transfusion—Why Not for Jehovah's Witnesses? (1977)
Jehovah's Witnesses (1966)
Kingdom Ministry School Course—Outline of Program and Notes (1966)
Manual of Theocratic News Service Information (1956)
Order of Trial (1939)
Christianity Is Not Free in Lagrange, Georgia (1937)
Christianity Is Not Free in the United States of America (1936)
Information by the Peoples Pulpit Association, To the Honorable Federal Communications Commission, Broadcasting Division (1934)
In Rebuttal—To the Honorable Federal Communications Commission, Broadcast Division (1934)
The Watchtower Radio Stations, WORD & WBBR (1925)
The Golden Age ABC (1920)
The Messenger of Laodicea (1919)
Harvest Siftings (1917, two parts)
Our Temple (1914)

Tracts 
 Would You Like to Know the Truth? (2008)
 Youths—What Will You Do With Your Life? (2002; out of print, available online)

Watch Tower Tracts series (1881)
 No. 1—Why Will There Be a Second Advent?
 No. 2—(Title uncertain)
 No. 3—(Title uncertain)
 No. 4—Why Evil Was Permitted
 No. 5—The Narrow Way to Life
 No. 6—Albert Delmont Jones: A Call to "The Marriage Supper of the Lamb." The Hour of God's Judgment, and Consequent Fall of Babylon
 No. 7—Work of Atonement—Tabernacle Types

The Old Theology series (1889–1908)
 No. 1—Do the Scriptures Teach That Eternal Torment Is the Wages of Sin?—1889
 No. 2—The Scripture Teaching on Calamities, and Why God Permits Them
 No. 3—Protestants, Awake! The Spirit of the Great Reformation Dying. How Priestcraft Now Operates
 No. 4—Dr. Talmage's View of the Millennium
 No. 5—Friendly Hints on Bible Study and Students' Helps—1890
 No. 6—The Scripture Teaching Concerning the World's Hope (The Hope of the Groaning Creation)
 No. 7—The Wonderful Story of Wisdom, Love and Grace Divine (The Wonderful Story—The Old, Old Story)
 No. 8—The Wonderful Story—Illustrated—1891
 No. 9—(Swedish translation of No. 1)
 No. 10—A Broad Basis for True Christian Union. Contend Earnestly for the Faith Once Delivered to the Saints

 No. 11—The Tabernacle Shadows of the "Better Sacrifices"—1892
 No. 12—The Divine Plan of the Ages for Human Salvation—Why Evil Was Permitted
 No. 13—(Norwegian translation of No. 1)
 No. 14—Bible Study and Needful Helps Thereto
 No. 15—"Thy Word Is Truth"—An Answer to Robert Ingersoll's Charges Against Christianity
 No. 16—(Same as No. 15 in booklet form)—1893
 No. 17—The Scripture Teaching on Purgatory
 No. 18—Did Christ Die as Man's Representative, or as His Substitute?
 No. 19—(Norwegian translation of No. 14)
 No. 20—(Swedish translation of No. 14)

 No. 21—Do You Know?—1894
 No. 22—(Same as No. 6)
 No. 23—(German translation of No. 21)
 No. 24—(Same as No. 5)
 No. 25—The Only Name—A Criticism of Bishop Foster's New Gospel—1895
 No. 26—(Swedish translation of No. 21)
 No. 27—(Same as No. 14)
 No. 28—Why Are Ye Last to Welcome Back the King?
 No. 29—(Norwegian translation of No. 21)
 No. 30—(German translation of No. 28)
 No. 30—(Extra) Wait Thou Upon the Lord

 No. 31—(Extra) A Helping Hand for Bible Students
 No. 32—What Say the Scriptures About Hell?—1896
 No. 33—(Dutch translation of No. 1)
 No. 34—(German translation of No. 1)
 No. 35—(Swedish translation of No. 28)
 No. 35—(Extra) (French translation of No. 21)
 No. 36—Awake! Jerusalem, Awake!—1897
 No. 36—(Extra) (French translation of No. 22)
 No. 37—"How Readest Thou?"
 No. 38—The Hope of Immortality
 No. 39—What Say the Scriptures About Spiritualism (Spiritism)?
 No. 40—What Is the Soul?—1898

 No. 41—Must We Abandon Hope of a Golden Age?
 No. 42—Crosses True and False. Crucified With Christ
 No. 43—The Bible Versus the Evolution Theory
 No. 44—Gathering the Lord's Jewels—1899
 No. 45—(Same as No. 8)
 No. 46—The Good Shepherd and His Two Flocks
 No. 47—(Swedish translation of No. 40)
 No. 48—What Say the Scriptures About Our Lord's Return—His Parousia, Apokalupsis and Epiphania—1900
 No. 49—Which Is the True Gospel?
 No. 50—(German translation of No. 49)

 No. 51—Heathendom's Hope Future, Therefore Wait Thou Upon the Lord
 No. 52—Food for Thinking Christians—Our Lord's Return—Its Object, the Restitution of All Things Spoken—1901
 No. 53—The Scriptures Clearly Teach the Old Theology That Death Is the Wages of Sin, and Not Eternal Torment
 No. 54—(Same as No. 14)
 No. 55—(Same as No. 32)
 No. 56—Epistle to the Hebrews (Yiddish only)—1902
 No. 57—The Scripture Teaching on Calamities and Why God Permits Them
 No. 58—(Same as No. 17)
 No. 59—The World's Hope
 No. 60—Why Are Ye the Last to Welcome Back the King?—1903

 No. 61—Protestants, Awake! (revised)
 No. 62—(Same as No. 12)
 No. 63—Christ's Death Secured One Probation or Trial for Life Everlasting to Every Man
 No. 64—Criticisms of Millennial Hopes and Prospects Examined—1904
 No. 65—(Same as No. 11)
 No. 66—(Same as No. 21)
 No. 67—(Dutch translation of No. 21)
 No. 68—Increasing Influence of Spiritism—1905
 No. 69—Study to Show Thyself Approved Unto God. Christendom in Grave Danger. Refrain Thy Voice From Weeping. Hope for the Innumerable Non-Elect
 No. 70—Cheerful Christians. Divine Predestination in Respect to Mankind

 No. 71—(Same as No. 15)
 No. 72—To Hell and Back! Who Are There. The Great Prison House to be Destroyed. The Oath-Bound Covenant. Selling the Birthright—1906
 No. 73—(Same as No. 57)
 No. 74—Divine Plan of the Ages for Human Salvation
 No. 75—Spiritism Is Demonism!
 No. 76—Earthquakes in Prophecy. "Tongues of Fire." "In the Evil Day." Filthiness of Flesh and Spirit—1907
 No. 77—God's Unspeakable Gift. What Would Satisfy Jesus for His Travail of Soul at Calvary?
 No. 78—Physical Health Promoted by Righteousness
 No. 79—The Lost Key of Knowledge. What Would Satisfy Jesus for His Travail of Soul at Calvary?
 No. 80—Are You of the Hopeful or of the Hopeless? Seven Women Desire One Husband. The Millennial Morning Is Dawning! The Ransom Price Paid for Sinners Guarantees a Millennial Age of Restitution—1908

 No. 81—Gathering the Lord's Jewels. The Hope of Immortality
 No. 82—What Is the Soul?
 No. 83—An Open Letter to a Seventh-Day Adventist

The Bible Students Monthly series (1913–1918) 
The Fall of Babylon (monthly, special subtitle during 1917–1918)
Everybody's Paper (monthly, 1911–1913)
Peoples Pulpit (monthly, 1909–1911)

Kingdom News series 
Tracts in the Kingdom News series have been published intermittently since 1918.

No. 1—Religious Intolerance—Pastor Russell's Followers Persecuted Because They Tell the People the Truth—Treatment of Bible Students Smacks of the 'Dark Ages—1918
No. 2—"The Finished Mystery" and Why Suppressed—Clergymen Take a Hand—1918
No. 3—Two Great Battles Raging—Fall of Autocracy Certain—Satanic Strategy Doomed to Failure—The Birth of Antichrist—1918

No. 4—Attempt to Wreck Garden Assembly—The Facts—1939
No. 5—Can Religion Save the World From Disaster?—1939
No. 6—Time of Darkness—Isaiah 60:2—1940
No. 6—Which Will Give You Freedom? Religion or Christianity? (London)—1940
No. 7—Do You Condemn or Wink at Unspeakable Crimes?—1940
No. 7—Religionists Devise Mischief to Destroy Christians (London)—1940
No. 8—If the Bill Becomes Law—1941
No. 8—Jehovah's Mandate to His Servants; Witness Against Papal Rome, Nazism, Fascism—Enemies of Christianity (London)—1941
No. 9—Victories in Your Defense—1941
No. 9—Where Does the Church of Scotland Stand? (London)—1941
No. 10—Life in the New Earth Under New Heavens—1942
No. 11—The People Have a Right to Good News Now—1942
No. 12—The Last War Wins the Peace Eternal—1943
No. 13—Education for Life in the New World—1944
No. 14—Overcoming Fear of What Is Coming on the Earth—1944
No. 15—World Conspiracy Against the Truth—1946

No. 16—Is Time Running Out for Mankind?—1973
No. 17—Has Religion Betrayed God and Man?—1973
No. 18—Government by God, Are You for It—Or Against It?—1974
No. 19—Is This All There Is to Life?—1974
No. 20—Would You Welcome Some Good News?—1975
No. 21—Your Future—Shaky? Or ... Secure?—1975
No. 22—How Crime and Violence Will Be Stopped—1976
No. 23—Why So Much Suffering—If God Cares?—1976
No. 24—The Family—Can It Survive?—1977
No. 25—Why Are We Here?—1978
No. 26—Relief From Pressure—Is It Possible?—1978
No. 27—What Has Happened to Love?—1979
No. 28—Hope for Ending Inflation, Sickness, Crime, War?—1980
No. 29—Is a Happy Life Really Possible?—1981
No. 30—Is Planet Earth Near the Brink?—1981
No. 31—Are We Nearing Armageddon?—1982
No. 32—A United, Happy Family—What Is the Key?—1983
No. 33—Life—How Did It Get Here? By Evolution or by Creation?—1985

No. 34—Why Is Life So Full of Problems?—1995
No. 35—Will All People Ever Love One Another?—1997
No. 36—The New Millennium—What Does the Future Hold for You?—2000
No. 37—The End of False Religion Is Near!—2006
No. 38—Can the Dead Really Live Again? (Tract 35)—2013

Numbered series

 No. 1—What Do Jehovah's Witnesses Believe?—1951
 No. 2—Hell-Fire—Bible Truth or Pagan Scare?—1951
 No. 3—Jehovah's Witnesses, Communists or Christians?—1951
 No. 4—Awake from Sleep!—1951
 No. 5—Hope for the Dead—1952
 No. 6—The Trinity, Divine Mystery or Pagan Myth?—1952
 No. 7—How Valuable Is the Bible?—1952
 No. 8—Life in a New World—1952, revised 1964
 No. 9—The Sign of Christ's Presence—1953
 No. 10—Man's Only Hope for Peace—1953
 No. 11—Which Is the Right Religion?—1953
 No. 12—Do You Believe in Evolution or the Bible?—1953, revised 1968
 No. 13—Why You Can Trust the Bible—1987
 No. 14—What Do Jehovah's Witnesses Believe?—1987
 No. 15—Life in a Peaceful New World—1987, revised 1994
 No. 16—What Hope for Dead Loved Ones?—1987
 No. 17—A Peaceful New World—Will It Come?—1992
 No. 18—Jehovah's Witnesses—What Do They Believe?—1992
 No. 19—Will This World Survive?—1992, revised 2005
 No. 20—Comfort for the Depressed—1992, revised 2000
 No. 21—Enjoy Family Life—1992, revised 1998
 No. 22—Who Really Rules the World?—1992
 No. 23—Jehovah—Who Is He?—1998, revised 2001
 No. 24—Jesus Christ—Who Is He?—1999
 No. 25—Do You Have an Immortal Spirit?—2001
 No. 26—Would You Like to Know More About the Bible?—2001
 No. 27—All Suffering Soon to End!—2005
 No. 30—How Do You View the Bible?—2013
 No. 31—How Do You View the Future?—2013
 No. 32—What Is the Key to Happy Family Life?—2013
 No. 33—Who Really Controls the World?—2013
 No. 34—Will Suffering Ever End?—2013
 No. 35—Can the Dead Really Live Again?—2013
 No. 36—What Is the Kingdom of God?—2014
 No. 37—Where Can We Find Answers to Life's Big Questions?—2014

Targeted distribution
 Against the People (New York City)—1926
 Are You in Favor of Liberty (United States)—1933

 Important Notice to the People (Canada)—1933
 Quebec's Burning Hate for God and Christ and Freedom Is the Shame of All Canada—1946
 Quebec, You Have Failed Your People!—1947
 Regret and Protest by American Convention-Hosts Over Religious Discrimination Against Visiting Witnesses of Jehovah—1950
 Rwanda Persecutes Christians—1986
 How to Find the Road to Paradise (for Muslims)—1990
 Jehovah's Witnesses—A Christian Community (Arabic, for Muslims)—1992
 No. 71—Does Fate Rule Our Lives?—Or Does God Hold Us Responsible? (Asian languages, for Muslims)—1994, revised 2001
 No. 72—The Greatest Name (Asian languages, for Muslims)—1994, revised 2001
 No. 73—Who Are Jehovah's Witnesses? (Turkish, for Muslims)—1995, revised 2001
 No. 74—Hellfire—Is It Part of Divine Justice? (Indonesian and Turkish, for Muslims)—1995, revised 2001
 No. 75—Will Suffering Ever End? (Asian languages, for Buddhists)—1996
 Jehovah's Witnesses—What You Need to Know (French, Dutch)—1996
 Religious Persecution in Singapore—1996
 No. 76—Jehovah's Witnesses Reply (Serbian)—1997
 No. 77—How Precious Is Life to You? (Mongolian, for Buddhists)—1999
 People of France, You Are Being Deceived! (French, English)—1999
 No. 78—It Could Happen to You! (Russian)—2000
 What Is Brewing In France? Could Freedom Regress? (French)—2000
 "You Are the Light of the World" (Spanish)—2000
 No. 79—You Can Benefit! (Czech)—2001
 No. 81—Is Your Life Ruled by Fate? (Chinese)—2007
 No. 82—You Can Trust the Creator! (for Native Americans)—2008
 No. 83—Could It Happen Again? A Question for the Citizens of Russia (Russian)—2010
 No. 85—Jehovah's Witnesses—Rights and Responsibilities in Sharing the Good News With Our Neighbours (India)—2012

Other
The Minister's Daughter—1882
Arp Slip (Arp Tract)—1887
Calamities—Why Permitted?—1919
Christian Science—1919
Comforting Words of Life—1919
Demons Infest Earth's Atmosphere—1919
Do You Believe in the Resurrection?—1919
Do You Know?—1919
Earth to Be Filled With Glory—1919
Gathering the Lord's Jewels—1919
Golden Age at the Door—1919
Hope of Immortality—1919
Is There a God?—1919
Is the Soul Immortal?—1919
Joyful Message for the Sin-Sick—1919
Our Responsibility as Christians—1919
Predestination and Election—1919
Spiritism Is Demonism—1919
The Bruising of Satan—1919
The Case of the International Bible Students Association—1919
The Dawn of a New Era—1919
The Liberty of the Gospel—1919
The Rich Man in Hell—1919
Thieves in Paradise—1919
Weeping All Night—1919
What Is the Soul?—1919
Where Are the Dead?—1919
Why God Permits Evil—1919
Proclamation—A Challenge to World Leaders—1922
Proclamation—A Warning to All Christians—1923
Ecclesiastics Indicted—1924
The Broadcaster—1924
Message of Hope—1925
World Powers Addressed (A Testimony to the Rulers of the World)—1926
"Where Are the Nine?"—1928
You Have Been Warned—1936
Dividing the People—1940
It Must Be Stopped—1940
Law-Abiding—1940
How Has Christendom Failed All Mankind?—1958
Would You Like to Understand the Bible?—1968

Recordings
 New World Translation of the Holy Scriptures (2013) (MP3)
 New World Translation of the Holy Scriptures (1984) (CD, MP3)
 The Watchtower Announcing Jehovah's Kingdom (CD in Red Book CD-DA format, 2005)
 The Watchtower Announcing Jehovah's Kingdom (CD in MP3 format, 2004)
 The Watchtower Announcing Jehovah's Kingdom (cassette, 1988)

 Awake! (CD in digital audio format, 2005)
 Awake! (CD in MP3 format, 2004)
 Awake! (cassette, 1990)

Dramas
The Watch Tower Society produces audio recordings of dramatic presentations of biblical characters or contemporary settings with a religious theme. Audio recordings, including dialog, music, and sound effects, are produced at the Watch Tower Society headquarters and other branch offices. The recordings are presented at annual conventions of Jehovah's Witnesses, usually accompanied by members acting out the scenes with costumes and props. The recordings (audio and sign language) are later made available for home use by members.
"Not One Word Has Failed" (Joshua) (sign language) (2014)
"Do Not Give the Devil an Opportunity" (contemporary) (sign language only) (2014)
Prepare Your Heart for the Trials Ahead (Esther) (sign language only) (2013)
"Show Yourself Attentive to the Wonderful Works of God" (contemporary) (sign language only) (2013)
What Is True Love? (contemporary) (sign language only) (2012)
Young Ones—Be Discreet and Wise (Joseph) (sign language only) (2011)
"These Words... Must Prove to Be on Your Heart" (contemporary) (sign language only) (2011)
 'Walk by Faith and Not by Sight'  (flight of Christians from Jerusalem) (sign language only) (2010)
"Your Brother Was Dead and Came to Life" (contemporary) (sign language only) (2009)
Do Not Leave "the Love You Had at First" (first-century Christians) (sign language only) (2008)
Clothe Yourselves With Lowliness of Mind (Gehazi) (sign language only) (2007)
To Whose Authority Do You Submit? (Jeroboam, prophet) (sign language only) (2006)
Pursue Goals That Honor God (Timothy) (sign language only) (2005)
They Bore Thorough Witness to the Good News (Paul) (sign language only) (2004)
Boldly Witnessing Despite Opposition (Stephen) (sign language only) (2003)
Stand Firm in Troublesome Times (Jeremiah) (sign language only) (2002)
Respect Jehovah's Authority (Korah) (2001)
Warning Examples for Our Day (Zimri) (2000)
Appreciating Our Spiritual Heritage (Jacob and Esau) (1999)
Families—Make Daily Bible Reading Your Way of Life! (Shadrach, Meshach, and Abednego) (audio only) (1998)
Keep Your Eye Simple (contemporary) (audio only) (1998)
Marked for Survival (contemporary) (audio only) (1998)
Why Respect Theocratic Arrangements? (Gideon) (audio only) (1997)
Doing What is Right in Jehovah's Eyes (Josiah) (audio only) (1993)
Doing God's Will With Zeal (Jehu) (audio only) (1992)
Jehovah's Judgment Against Law-Defying People (Noah and Lot) (audio only) (1990)
Preserving Life in Time of Famine (Joseph) (audio only) (1990)
Jehovah Delivers Those Calling Upon His Name (Joshua) (audio only) (1987)
Beware of Losing Faith by Drawing Away From Jehovah (Moses) (audio only) (1982)
Jehovah's Name to be Declared in All the Earth (Plagues of Egypt) (audio only) (1981)

Dramatic Bible readings
Since 2007, Witness conventions have featured 'sound dramas'—audio recordings of Bible passages read in a dramatic fashion, accompanied by music, sound effects, and extra dialog. The recordings are later made available for download from the official website.
Jehovah Caused Them to Rejoice (Nehemiah) (2020)
Jehovah Kept Showing Loyal Love (Joseph) (2019)
"Be Courageous and Strong and Go to Work"! (David) (2018)
Jehovah Delivers His People (Plagues of Egypt) (2017)
"For This I Have Come Into the World" (Jesus and the Pharisees) (2015)
Jehovah Is the Only True God (Elijah) (2014)
Be Faithful and Conquer Your Fears (Saint Peter) (2013)
Fortify Your Hearts to Be Witnesses (Jesus' resurrection) (2012)
A True Story That Inspires Hope (Ruth and Naomi) (2011)
Do Not Give Out When Corrected by Jehovah! (Jonah) (2010)
"Until I Expire I Shall Not Take Away My Integrity!" (Job, Daniel) (2009)
Become Hearers and Doers of God's Word (Jesus, Satan, Elijah and the widow) (2008)
God's Word "Is Alive and Exerts Power" (Jesus' miracles) (2007)

Videos

Movies

References

Sources
Watchtower Publications Index, 2022. Watch Tower Bible & Tract Society.
Announcement to all Congregations, November 2015. Watch Tower Bible & Tract Society.
List of Publications Approved for Discard, October 2020. Watch Tower Bible & Tract Society.

External links 

Literature published by Jehovah's Witnesses

Literature lists
Christianity-related lists